Maryam Jumaa Faraj is an Emirati short story writer.

As of 2008, Faraj had published two volumes of short stories, beginning with Fayruz in 1988 and continuing in 1994 with Ma''' (Water''). Many of her stories take as their theme the lives and concerns of Indian expatriate workers in the United Arab Emirates. Some of her work has been anthologized in English.

References

Living people
Emirati short story writers
Year of birth missing (living people)
Women short story writers
20th-century short story writers
21st-century short story writers
21st-century Emirati writers
21st-century Emirati women writers
20th-century Emirati writers
20th-century Emirati women writers